Vespamantoida is a genus of praying mantises in the family Mantoididae. The genus was erected in 2019 and the name was derived from the Latin word vespa which means wasp and Mantoida referring to the mantis. These mantis resemble and mimic the behavior of a wasp.

Species
There are two species of mantises in this genus:

 Vespamantoida toulgoeti
 Vespamantoida wherleyi

References

Mantoididae
Mantodea genera